Werner Krüger (November 23, 1910 – October 21, 2003) was a German engineer who invented the Krueger flap in 1943.  He evaluated Krueger (Krüger) flaps in the wind tunnels of Göttingen Aerodynamische Versuchsanstalt, AVA in 1944. Krueger flaps are aircraft lift enhancement devices fitted under the leading edge of an aircraft wing where a portion of the lower wing is rotated out in front of the main wing leading edge.  Boeing flight tested Krueger flaps on the B-707 prototype on 15 July 1954 and first used Krueger flaps in production for the B-727 maiden flight on 9 February 1963.    Leading edge Krueger flaps enhance wing's low speed lift production especially on swept wing aircraft.

References

External links 
 Hamburg University of Applied Sciences: German Development of the Swept Wing (German) (pdf-document)

20th-century German engineers
20th-century German inventors
1910 births
2003 deaths
German aerospace engineers
People from Kołobrzeg
People from the Province of Pomerania